Juwayn ibn Malik (or al-Tamimi) (Arabic: جُوَین بن مالِک) was martyred in the Battle of Karbala.

In the Battle of Karbala 
As a member of 'Umar ibn Sa'd army, he came to Karbala to fight with Husayn ibn Ali. However, when he saw that Ubayd Allah ibn Ziyad did not accept the suggestion of Husayn and they engaged in a war, he joined Husayn at night with some people of his tribe. They have been mentioned as seven people. He was martyred in the first attack of the army of Ibn Sa'd on the Day of Ashura. His name has been mentioned in Ziyara al-Shuhada: "Peace be upon Juwayn ibn Malik al-Duba'i."

References 

People killed at the Battle of Karbala
Husayn ibn Ali
Hussainiya

600s births
Year of birth uncertain
680 deaths